Erebia is a Holarctic genus of brush-footed butterflies, family Nymphalidae. Most of the about 90–100 species (see also below) are dark brown or black in color, with reddish-brown to orange or more rarely yellowish wing blotches or bands. These usually bear black spots within, which sometimes have white center spots.

This genus has found it easy to adapt to arid and especially cold conditions. Most of its members are associated with high-altitude lands, forest clearings or high latitude and tundra. Erebia species are frequent in the Alps, Rocky Mountains, subarctic and even Arctic regions, and the cooler parts of Central Asia. In fact, the North American term for these butterflies is alpines. Palearctic species are collectively known as ringlets or arguses. However, none of these terms is used exclusively for this genus.

Taxonomy and systematics
The genus Erebia was erected by Johan Wilhelm Dalman in 1816. As type species, the Arran brown—described as Papilio ligea by Carl Linnaeus in 1758—was chosen. This is a very complex genus with over 1300 taxa, but a massive proportion of these are junior synonyms. Some of the available names are listed by Vladimir Lukhtanov. A fully comprehensive taxonomic checklist (i.e., without discussing synonymy and relationships) was published in 2008.

Only three years after the genus' inception, the known species were reviewed by Jacob Hübner. He established no less than five new genera for a fraction of what would eventually be named as "species" of Erebia. But things hardly improved as more and more of the diversity of these butterflies came to note. In Europe, a large number of Erebia taxa was described from the Alps. In the 19th and early 20th century the Alps were a popular destination for butterfly collectors and specimens of Alpine butterflies were very profitable for dealers. The dealers, mostly German, not only sold specimens, but were entomologists, entomological book dealers, entomological authors and publishers. Examples are Fritz Rühl, Alexander Heyne, Otto Staudinger, Andreas and Otto Bang-Haas and, in Paris, Achille and Émile Deyrolle.

This, together with the then-popular, even obsessive study of variation by entomologists – examples are James William Tutt, George Wheeler, Felix Bryk and Brisbane Charles Somerville Warren – led to very many names being applied to what may be or much more likely may not be biological species or subspecies. A further problem is the use of the term "variety". Authors of that time used this for an individual variant, a group of individuals morphologically but not otherwise related, seasonal forms, temperature-related forms, or geographic races; it was later usually taken to mean the last subspecies though this is often suspected to have been premature.

Eventually, it became common to arrange supposed species and subspecies to "species groups" (not superspecies, but an informal phenetic arrangement) as pioneered by B.C.S. Warren, and attempt to resolve their true nature by and by. As molecular phylogenetic studies add to the available data, it is becoming clear that most "varieties" that have at least been commonly considered subspecies in the latter 20th century are indeed lineages distinct enough to warrant some formal degree of recognition. Another result of recent research is confirmation of the theory that this genus contains many glacial relict taxa, e.g., in the brassy ringlet group (E. tyndarus and similar species).

The number of currently recognized Erebia species is given variously around 90-100, as developments happen so fast that it is hard for authors to remain up to date regarding the newest changes.

Species list
As of early 2008, the following good species and some rather distinct subspecies are listed:

 Erebia aethiopella (Hoffmannsegg, 1806) – false Mnestra ringlet
 Erebia aethiops (Esper, 1777) – Scotch argus
 Erebia ajanensis Ménétriés, 1857
 Erebia alberganus (Prunner, 1798) – almond ringlet or almond-eyed ringlet
 Erebia alcmena Grum-Grshimailo, 1891
 Erebia alini (Bang-Haas, 1937) (disputed)
 Erebia anyuica Kurenzov, 1966 – scree alpine
 Erebia arctica R.Poppius, 1906
 Erebia atramentaria O.Bang-Haas, 1927
 Erebia calcaria Lorković, 1949 – Lorkovic's brassy ringlet
 Erebia callias Edwards, 1871
 Erebia (callias) altajana Staudinger, 1901
 Erebia (callias) callias – Colorado alpine
 Erebia (callias) sibirica Staudinger, 1881
 Erebia (callias) simulata Warren, 1933
 Erebia cassioides (Reiner & Hohenwarth, 1792) – common brassy ringlet
 Erebia (cassioides) arvernensis Oberthür 1908 – western brassy ringlet
 Erebia (cassioides) carmenta Fruhstorfer, 1907 – western brassy ringlet
 Erebia (cassioides) macedonica Buresch, 1918
 Erebia christi Rätzer, 1890 – Raetzer's ringlet
 Erebia claudina (Borkhausen, 1789) – white speck ringlet
 Erebia cyclopius (Eversmann, 1844)
 Erebia dabanensis Erschoff, 1871
 Erebia disa (Thunberg, 1791) – Arctic ringlet or disa alpine
 Erebia discoidalis Kirby, 1837 – red-disked alpine
 Erebia dromulus Staudinger, 1901
 Erebia edda Ménétriés, 1851
 Erebia embla (Thunberg, 1791) – Lapland ringlet
 Erebia epiphron (Knoch, 1783) – mountain ringlet or small mountain ringlet
 Erebia epipsodea Butler, 1868 – common alpine
 Erebia epistygne (Hübner, 1819) – spring ringlet
 Erebia erinnyn Warren, 1932
 Erebia eriphyle (Freyer, 1836) – eriphyle ringlet
 Erebia eugenia Churkin, 2000
 Erebia euryale (Esper, 1805) – large ringlet
 Erebia fasciata Butler, 1868 – banded alpine
 Erebia flavofasciata Heyne, 1895 – yellow-banded ringlet
 Erebia fletcheri Elwes, 1899
 Erebia gorge (Esper, 1805) – silky ringlet
 Erebia gorgone – Gavarnie ringlet
 Erebia graucasica Jachontov, 1909
 Erebia haberhaueri Staudinger, 1881
 Erebia hewitsoni Lederer, 1864
 Erebia hispania Butler, 1868 – Spanish brassy ringlet
 Erebia inuitica Wyatt, 1966 (disputed)
 Erebia iranica Grum-Grshimailo, 1895
 Erebia jeniseiensis Trybom, 1877
 Erebia kalmuka Alphéraky, 1881
 Erebia kefersteini (Eversmann, 1851)
 Erebia kindermanni Staudinger, 1881
 Erebia kozhantshikovi Sheljuzhko, 1925
 Erebia lafontainei (Troubridge & Philip, 1983) – reddish alpine
 Erebia lefebvrei (Boisduval, [1828]) – Lefèbvre's ringlet
 Erebia ligea (Linnaeus, 1758) – Arran brown
 Erebia mackinleyensis (Gunder, 1932) – Mt. McKinley alpine
 Erebia magdalena Strecker, 1880 – Magdalena alpine
 Erebia mancinus Doubleday, [1849] – taiga alpine
 Erebia manto ([Schiffermüller], 1775) – yellow-spotted ringlet
 Erebia maurisius Lukhtanov & Lukhtanov, 1994 (might be Erebia brimo (Böber, 1809))
 Erebia medusa (Denis & Schiffermüller, 1975) – woodland ringlet
 Erebia medusa polaris Staudinger, 1871 – Arctic woodland ringlet
 Erebia melampus (Fuessli, 1775) – lesser mountain ringlet
 Erebia melancholica Herrich-Schäffer, [1846]
 Erebia melas (Herbst, 1796) – black ringlet
 Erebia meolans (Prunner, 1798) – Piedmont ringlet
 Erebia meta Staudinger, 1886
 Erebia mnestra (Hübner, [1803-1804]) – Mnestra's ringlet
 Erebia montana (de Prunner, 1798) – marbled ringlet
 Erebia neoridas (Boisduval, [1828]) – autumn ringlet
 Erebia neriene (Böber, 1809)
 Erebia niphonica Janson, 1877
 Erebia nivalis Lorković & Lesse, 1954 – de Lesse's brassy ringlet
 Erebia occulta Roos & Kimmich, 1983 – Eskimo alpine
 Erebia ocnus (Eversmann, 1843)
 Erebia oeme (Hübner, [1803-1804]) – bright-eyed ringlet
 Erebia orientalis Elwes, 1900
 Erebia ottomana Herrich-Schäffer, [1851] – Ottoman brassy ringlet
 Erebia (ottomana) benacensis Warren, 1933
 Erebia palarica Chapman, 1905 – Chapman's ringlet
 Erebia pandrose (Borkhausen, 1788) – dewy ringlet
 Erebia pawlowskii Ménétriés, 1859 – yellow-dotted alpine or Theano alpine
 Erebia pharte (Hübner, [1803-1804]) – blind ringlet
 Erebia pluto (de Prunner, 1798) – sooty ringlet
 Erebia progne Grum-Grshimailo, 1890
 Erebia pronoe (Esper, 1780) – water ringlet
 Erebia radians Staudinger, 1886
 Erebia rhodopensis Nicholl, 1900 - Nicholl's ringlet
 Erebia rondoui Oberthür 1908 (previously in E. cassioides)
 Erebia rossii (Curtis, 1835) – Arctic–alpine or Ross's alpine
 Erebia rurigena (disputed)
 Erebia sachaensis Dubatolov, 1992
 Erebia scipio Boisduval, 1832 – larche ringlet
 Erebia serotina Descimon & de Lesse, 1953 – Descimon's ringlet
 Erebia sibo (Alphéraky, 1881)
 Erebia sokolovi Lukhtanov, 1990
 Erebia sthennyo Graslin, 1850 – false dewy ringlet
 Erebia stirius (Godart, [1824]) – Styrian ringlet
 Erebia stubbendorfii Ménétriés, 1846
 Erebia styx (Freyer, 1834) – Stygian ringlet
 Erebia sudetica Staudinger, 1861 – Sudeten ringlet
 Erebia theano (Tauscher, 1806) – Theano alpine
 Erebia tianschanica Heyne, [1894]
 Erebia transcaucasica Warren, 1950 (previously in E. graucasica)
 Erebia triarius (de Prunner, 1798) – de Prunner's ringlet
 Erebia troubridgei (Dubatolov, 1992)
 Erebia turanica Erschoff, [1877]
 Erebia tyndarus (Esper, 1781) – Swiss brassy ringlet
 Erebia usgentensis Heyne, [1894]
 Erebia vidleri Elwes, 1898 – northwest alpine or Vidler's alpine
 Erebia wanga Bremer, 1864
 Erebia youngi Holland, 1900 – Yukon alpine or four-dotted alpine
 Erebia zapateri Oberthür, 1875 – Zapater's ringlet

Gallery

Erebia comparison

See also
 Other Lepidoptera genera with excessive named taxa:
 Agrias
 Parnassius
 Prepona
 Morpho
 Species concept

Footnotes

References
  (2008). Molecular phylogeny of the Erebia tyndarus (Lepidoptera, Rhopalocera, Nymphalidae, Satyrinae) species group combining CoxII and ND5 mitochondrial genes: A case study of a recent radiation. Mol. Phylogenet. Evol. 47(1): 196–210.  (HTML abstract)
  (2006). Tree of Life Web Project - Erebia. Version of 28 November 2006. Retrieved 11 August 2008.
  [1819]. [Several new genera for Erebia]. In: Verzeichniss bekannter Schmettlinge [sic] (Vol.4): 62-64.
  [2008]. Palaearctic Butterfly Checklist - Nymphalidae: Satyrinae. Version of 4 February 2008. Retrieved 11 August 2008.
  (2008). Markku Savela's Lepidoptera and Some Other Life Forms - Erebia. Version of 15 March 2008. Retrieved 11 August 2008.
  (2008). A checklist of the satyrine genus Erebia (Lepidoptera) (1758–2006). Zootaxa 1900: 1-109. PDF contents, abstract and first page text
  (1936). Monograph of the genus Erebia. British Museum of Natural History, London.

External links

 Nearctica Images of some Nearctic species.
 Nearctic species
 European species
 Rusinsects Former U.S.S.R. Erebia photographs, accurate text.
 Kulfan pdf Erebia fauna of the Tatras
 Zipcode Zoo
  Pdf from Nagy et al. Alpine Biodiversity in Europe (Arctic–Alpine Butterflies).
 Flickr images

 
Taxa named by Johan Wilhelm Dalman
Butterfly genera
Taxonomy articles created by Polbot